Street Slam is a basketball video game developed by Data East for Neo Geo, released in 1994. The game features three-on-three basketball match-ups with a variety of different teams. Street Slam is the only basketball game released on the Neo Geo.

A sequel to the game, known as Dunk Dream '95 in Japan, Hoops '96 in Europe, and simply Hoops in North America, was released in 1995. In 2010, the original game was released for the Wii on the Virtual Console, as well as part of the compilation Data East Arcade Classics.

Gameplay

In the US version of the game, players can select a three-player team from a selection of 10 city-based teams in the United States. In the European and Japanese versions of the game, the cities are replaced with countries around the world. The selection screens, player skin colours and costumes also change between the versions.

Each team has a total of 18 points in several characteristics (Dunk, 3pts, Speed, and Defence), and 8pts max for each. Every team has its own strengths and weaknesses. For example, New York (USA in the JP/EU Version) is good in dunks and bad in 3-pointers; on the other hand, Philadelphia (Taiwan in JP/EU version) is good in 3-pointers and bad in dunks.

Release
Street Slam was first released on the Neo Geo MVS on December 8, 1994, in Japan. The home version was released on the Neo Geo AES on December 9, 1994, and on the Neo Geo CD on January 20, 1995.

Reception

In Japan, Game Machine listed Street Slam on their 15 February 1995, issue as being the eighteenth most-popular arcade game at the time. In North America, RePlay reported the game to be the third most-popular arcade game at the time. According to Famitsu, the Neo Geo CD sold over 4,873 copies in its first week on the market.

On release, Famitsu scored the Neo Geo version of the game a 25 out of 40. Next Generation reviewed the Neo-Geo version of the game, rating it two stars out of five.

Retrospective reviews

Street Slam has been met with equally positive reception from retrospective reviewers in recent years.

Notes

References

External links
 
 Street Slam at GameFAQs
 Street Slam at Giant Bomb
 Street Hoop at Killer List of Videogames
 Street Slam at Killer List of Videogames
 Street Slam at MobyGames

1994 video games
ACA Neo Geo games
Arcade video games
Basketball video games
D4 Enterprise games
Data East video games
Head-to-head arcade video games
Marvelous Entertainment franchises
Multiplayer and single-player video games
Neo Geo games
Neo Geo CD games
Nintendo Switch games
PlayStation Network games
PlayStation 4 games
SNK games
Virtual Console games
Windows games
Xbox One games
Zeebo games
Data East arcade games
Video games developed in Japan
Hamster Corporation games